Valley Green may refer to:

Valley Green, Pennsylvania
The Valley Green Inn, a historic roadhouse in the valley of the Wissahickon Creek at Philadelphia